John Hunter (December 30, 1802) was an American farmer from Newberry, South Carolina. He represented South Carolina in the U.S. House from 1793 until 1795 and in the United States Senate from 1796 to 1798.

Hunter was born in the Province of South Carolina around 1752, but his exact date of birth is not known.  He was educated in South Carolina and became a plantation owner and operator near Newberry, South Carolina.  He served in the South Carolina House of Representatives from 1786 to 1792, and was a Federalist presidential elector in 1792.

In 1792 he was elected to the United States House of Representatives.  He served in the 3rd Congress,  March 4, 1793 to March 3, 1795.  He was elected to the United States Senate as a Democratic-Republican, filling the vacancy caused by the resignation of Pierce Butler; he served from December 8, 1796, to November 26, 1798, when he resigned.

After leaving the Senate, Hunter resumed operation of his plantations.  He died on December 30, 1802, and was interred at Little River/Dominick Presbyterian Cemetery in Newberry County, South Carolina.

References

External links

1750s births
1802 deaths
Members of the South Carolina House of Representatives
Members of the United States House of Representatives from South Carolina
United States senators from South Carolina
South Carolina Democratic-Republicans
Democratic-Republican Party United States senators
People from Newberry, South Carolina
18th-century American politicians